Fahreza Agamal (born March 11, 1992) is an Indonesian professional footballer who plays as a defender.

Club statistics

References

External links

1992 births
Association football midfielders
Living people
Indonesian footballers
Liga 1 (Indonesia) players
Persija Jakarta players